Maldives Olympic Committee (IOC code: MDV) is the National Olympic Committee representing Maldives. It is also the body responsible for the Maldives' representation at the Commonwealth Games.

The Maldives was taking part in the 2012 Summer Olympics, and the Maldives Olympic Committee had chosen Bedford as the UK base for its competing athletes.

The Maldives was taking part in the 2020 Summer Olympics, and the Maldives Olympics Committee had chosen Odawara as the Japanese base for its competing athletes.

See also
Maldives at the Olympics
Maldives at the Commonwealth Games

References

External links
Maldives Olympic Committee archive

Maldives
Maldives
Olympic
Maldives at the Commonwealth Games
Maldives at the Olympics
1985 establishments in the Maldives
Sports organizations established in 1985